This is a list of scientific journals published by the Royal Society of Chemistry.

A 
 Analyst (1876–present)
 Analytical Communications (1996–1999)
 Analytical Methods (2009–present)
 Analytical Proceedings (1980–1993)
 Analytical Proceedings including Analytical Communications (1994–1995)
 Annual Reports on Analytical Atomic Spectroscopy (1971–1984)
 Annual Reports on the Progress of Chemistry Annual Reports on the Progress of Chemistry Section A (Inorganic chemistry) (1967–2013)
 Annual Reports on the Progress of Chemistry Section B (Organic chemistry) (1967–2013)
 Annual Reports on the Progress of Chemistry Section C (Physical chemistry) (1979–2013)

 B  

 Biomaterials Science (2013–present)

 C  

 Catalysis Science & Technology (2011-Present)
 Chemical Communications (1996-Present)
 Chemical Science (2010-Present)
 Chemical Society Reviews (1972-Present)
 Chemical Education Research and Practice (2000-Present)
 Contemporary Organic Synthesis CrystEngComm (1999-Present)

 D  

 Dalton Transactions (2003-Present)
 Digital Discovery (2022-This journal is coming soon)

 E 
 EES Catalysis (2022-present)
 Energy & Environmental Science (2008–present)
 Energy Advances (2022-This journal is coming soon)
 Environmental Science: Advances (2022-This journal is coming soon)
 Environmental Science: Atmosphere (2021-present)

 Environmental Science: Nano (2014–present)
 Environmental Science: Processes & Impacts (2013–present)
 Environmental Science: Water Research & Technology (2015–present)

 F  

 Faraday Discussions (1991-Present)
 Food & Function (2010-Present)

 G  

 Green Chemistry (1999–present)

 I 
 Industrial Chemistry & Materials (2022-present)
 Integrative Biology (2008–2018) (Now published by Oxford University Press)
 Inorganic Chemistry Frontiers (2014–present)

 J 

 Journal of Analytical Atomic Spectrometry (1986-Present)
 Journal of the Chemical Society Journal of the Chemical Society A: Inorganic, Physical, Theoretical (1966 - 1971)
 Journal of the Chemical Society B: Physical Organic (1966 - 1971)
 Journal of the Chemical Society C: Organic (1966 - 1971)
 Journal of the Chemical Society D: Chemical Communications (1969 - 1971)
 Journal of the Chemical Society, Abstracts (1878 - 1925)
 Journal of the Chemical Society, Faraday Transactions Journal of the Chemical Society, Faraday Transactions 1 Journal of the Chemical Society, Faraday Transactions 2 Journal of the Chemical Society, Transactions Journal of Materials Chemistry Journal of Materials Chemistry A (2013 - Present)
 Journal of Materials Chemistry B (2013 - Present)
 Journal of Materials Chemistry C (2013 - Present)
 Journal of the Royal Institute of Chemistry (1950 - 1964)

 L 
 Lab on a Chip (2001–present)

 M 
 Materials Advances (2020–present)
 Materials Chemistry Frontiers (2017–present)
 Materials Horizons (2014–present)
 MedChemComm (2010–present)
 Molecular Omics (2018–present)
 Molecular Systems Design & Engineering (2015–present)

 N 
 Nanoscale (2009-Present)
 Nanoscale Advances (2018-Present)
 Nanoscale Horizons (2016-Present)
 Natural Product Reports (1984-Present)
 Natural Product Updates New Journal of Chemistry (1998-Present)

 O 
 Organic and Biomolecular Chemistry (2003-Present)
 Organic Chemistry Frontiers (2014-Present)

 P 
 Perkin Transactions (1997 - 2002)
 Photochemical and Photobiological Sciences PhysChemComm (1998-2003)
 Physical Chemistry Chemical Physics (1999-Present)
 Polymer Chemistry (2010-Present)
 Proceedings of the Chemical Society R 

 Reaction Chemistry & Engineering (2016-Present)
 RSC Advances (2011-Present)
 RSC Applied Interfaces (2023-Present)
 RSC Applied Polymers (2023-Present)
 RSC Chemical Biology (2020-Present)
 RSC Medicinal Chemistry (2020-Present)
 RSC Sustainability (2022-Present)

 S 
 Sensors & Diagnostics (2020-This journal is coming soon)
 Soft Matter (2005–Present)
 Sustainable Energy & Fuels (2017–Present)
 Sustainable Food Technology'' (2022–Present)

References

External links 

 RSC journals, books and databases page

 
Royal Society of Chemistry journals